Chess and Backgammon Classics, retitled Chess Classics a week after release,  is a video game by Gameloft for the iPod Nano (3rd and 4th generation), the iPod classic, and the iPod (5th generation).

Chess and Backgammon Classics allows users to play chess against a human opponent, or a CPU opponent (difficulty settings are adjustable).  The chess game also has a quiz mode, which challenges users to solve situation-specific problems, and also includes classic matches actually played by international chess masters.

The game also lets users play backgammon against a human opponent, or a CPU opponent (difficulty settings are adjustable).

References

Chess software
IPod games
Gameloft games
Backgammon video games